Gyptis, minor planet designation: 444 Gyptis, is a main-belt asteroid that was discovered by J. Coggia on March 31, 1899, in Marseilles. It is classified as a C-type asteroid and is probably composed of carbonaceous material. The spectra of the asteroid displays evidence of aqueous alteration.

In 2004, Kochetova estimated Gyptis to have a mass of 1.25 kg with a high density of 5.53 g/cm3. The adaptive optics instrument at the W. M. Keck Observatory showed an object with a diameter of 129 km, which is much smaller than the estimate of 160 km from the IRAS observatory measurements, indicating an irregular shape. The size ratio between the major and minor axes is estimated at 1.40. Observations of an occultation on October 14, 2007, produced six chords indicating a cross-section ellipsoid of 179×150 km.

Between 1990 and 2021, 444 Gyptis has been observed to occult 17 stars.

References

External links 
 
 

Background asteroids
Gyptis
Gyptis
C-type asteroids (Tholen)
C-type asteroids (SMASS)
18990331
Objects observed by stellar occultation